The 1866 Eye by-election was held on 27 July 1866 after the incumbent Conservative MP Edward Kerrison resigned to contest East Suffolk.  The seat was uncontested and won by George Barrington who was the Private Secretary to the Earl of Derby.

References

Eye
Eye
1866 in England
1866 elections in the United Kingdom
Mid Suffolk District
Eye, Suffolk
July 1866 events